Pristimantis boulengeri is a species of frog in the family Strabomantidae.
It is endemic to Colombia.
Its natural habitats are tropical moist montane forests, arable land, pastureland, plantations, rural gardens, urban areas, heavily degraded former forest, irrigated land, and seasonally flooded agricultural land.

References

boulengeri
Endemic fauna of Colombia
Amphibians of Colombia
Amphibians of the Andes
Amphibians described in 1981
Taxonomy articles created by Polbot